Mirror Music is the debut solo studio album by American rapper Wordsworth. It was released by Halftooth Records in 2004.

Title
Regarding the album's title, Wordsworth commented: "I felt the songs reflected the emotion, time or period that either I went through, someone next to me went through or somebody that might not even know me went through." He added: "And when I look at people, the audience, and they look at me, I think they see a reflection from me in my music."

Critical reception

Kenny Rodriguez of AllHipHop wrote: "Mirror Music is proof that Words is much more than simply a freestyle MC with clever one-liners." He added: "Without totally immersing himself into the conscious genre, Words successfully jumps from dropping similes to dropping jewels in mid-sentence." Meanwhile, Nathan Rabin of The A.V. Club wrote: "Wordsworth is so good at playing the role of the wisecrack-dispensing smart-ass that it's almost a shame he spends so much of Mirror Music grappling soberly with the challenges of being a socially conscious adult and father." He added: "It's hard to fault an artist for trying to say something meaningful, but Wordsworth might have been better off putting out a funny album with a few serious songs instead of a serious album with a few light moments."

Track listing

References

External links
 

2004 debut albums
Wordsworth (rapper) albums
Albums produced by Ayatollah
Albums produced by Da Beatminerz